Ranchero is the term in the Spanish language for a rancher, meaning a person working on a ranch.
 Rancheros in South America
 Ranchos of California

Ranchero, or Rancheros, may also refer to:

Transportation
 Ford Ranchero, a Ford Motor Company vehicle model, manufactured between 1957 and 1979

Film and television
 The Ranchero's Revenge (1913)
 The Gay Ranchero (1948)
 Wavy Rancheros, a crocodile puppet recurring on The Late Late Show with Craig Ferguson

Music
 Ranchero music
 Huevos Rancheros (band)
 Corazón Ranchero, the fourth studio album by Shaila Dúrcal

Sports
 Santa Barbara Dodgers aka Santa Barbara Rancheros; former minor league baseball team in Santa Barbara, California

Other
 Huevos rancheros, an egg cuisine dish
 Rancheros visitadores, American social club

See also
 RancherOS
 Rancheros Creek
 Rancheria (disambiguation)
 Rancher (disambiguation)
 Rancho (disambiguation)